George Machin (30 December 1922 – 5 December 1989) was a British Labour Party politician, engineering inspector and shop steward.

Machin was a native of Sheffield and attended Marlcliffe School there. During the World War II he served in the RAF. After the war ended, he became an engineering inspector and active in the trade union movement. In 1967, he was elected to Sheffield City Council.

At a March 1973 by-election, he was elected as the Member of Parliament for Dundee East, holding off by 1,141 votes a strong challenge from Gordon Wilson of the Scottish National Party. The contest had been seen as three-way fight between Machine, Wilson and Lord Provost of Dundee, William Fitzgerald, standing as Conservative. On the day of the election it was speculated in The Glasgow Herald that the Labour vote may be hurt by the fact that Machin was an English candidate in a Scottish seat and because some local Labour supporters were angered as the felt Machin's trade union had used influence to "buy" his nomination. Signs that his English background was an issue were demonstrated during Machin's victory speech which was reportedly disrupted by 'angry shouts of Scottish Nationalist supporters', while police flanked him as he faced 'chants of "Go back to Yorkshire" and "Go home, Englishman"'.

At the February 1974 general election, Wilson gained the seat by 2,966 votes, thus ending Machin's tenure as an MP of just 11 months. Machin attempted unsuccessfully to regain his seat at the subsequent October 1974 general election but then retired from politics afterwards.

See also
 List of United Kingdom MPs with the shortest service

References 

Times Guide to the House of Commons February 1974

External links 
 

1922 births
1989 deaths
Amalgamated Engineering Union-sponsored MPs
Scottish Labour MPs
UK MPs 1970–1974
Royal Air Force personnel of World War II
Trade unionists from Sheffield
People associated with Dundee
Place of death missing
Members of the Parliament of the United Kingdom for Dundee constituencies